The 2018 European Motocross Championship was the 30th European Motocross Championship season since it was revived in 1988. It included 16 events and 5 different classes. It started at Valkenswaard in the Netherlands on 18 April, and ended at Imola in Italy on 30 September. All rounds acted as support classes at the European rounds of the 2018 MXGP.

EMX250
An 11-round calendar for the 2018 season was announced on 25 October 2017.
EMX250 is for riders competing on 4-stroke motorcycles between 175cc-250cc.

EMX250

Entry List

Riders Championship

Manufacturers Championship

EMX125
A 9-round calendar for the 2018 season was announced on 25 October 2017.
EMX125 is for riders competing on 2-stroke motorcycles of 125cc.

EMX125

Entry List

Riders Championship

Manufacturers Championship

EMX300
A 6-round calendar for the 2018 season was announced on 25 October 2017.
EMX300 is for riders competing on 2-stroke motorcycles between 200-300cc.

EMX300

Entry List

Riders Championship

Manufacturers Championship

EMX85
A 1-round calendar for the 2018 season was announced on 25 October 2017.
EMX85 is for riders competing on 2-stroke motorcycles of 85cc.

EMX85

Participants
Riders qualify for the championship by finishing in the top 10 in one of the 4 regional 85cc championships.

Riders Championship

EMX65
A 1-round calendar for the 2018 season was announced on 25 October 2017.
EMX65 is for riders competing on 2-stroke motorcycles of 65cc.

EMX65

Participants
Riders qualify for the championship by finishing in the top 10 in one of the 4 regional 85cc championships.

Riders Championship

References 

European Motocross Championship
European Motocross Championship
Motocross Championship